Gastrodia urceolata, commonly known as white potato orchid, is a leafless terrestrial mycotrophic orchid in the family Orchidaceae. It has a pale brown, fleshy flowering stem and up to fifty five upright, white to pale brown flowers. It is only known from a single population near Atherton in Queensland.

Description 
There are between ten and fifty upright white flowers which distinguish the species from other gastrodias in Australia.

Taxonomy and naming
Gastrodia urceolata was first formally described in 1991 by David Jones from a specimen collected near Atherton in 1988. The description was published in Australian Orchid Research. The specific epithet (urceolata) is derived from the Latin word urceus meaning "pitcher" or "urn" referring to the shape of the capsule.

Distribution and habitat
The white potato orchid is only known from a single population on the Atherton Tableland where it grows in forest.

References 

urceolata
Plants described in 1991
Terrestrial orchids
Orchids of Queensland